Crieff and Strathearn RFC is a rugby union club based in Crieff, Scotland.

History

There was previously rugby at Crieff. At the end of the 19th century there was a club known as St. Michael's Guild Rugby Club from around 1889 which then became Crieff rugby club.

This side went defunct but there was another attempt to create a Crieff rugby club, based around ex-players of the Crieff Academy around 1896.

From the 1920s there was another Crieff club based on ex-Morrisons Academy players. Known as the Morrisonian club or Morrison Academy F.P., the club played to at least the mid-1930s and it seems likely it did not survive the Second World War.

The present club was founded in 1972, and the club celebrated its 40th anniversary in 2012.

Sides

The club runs a men's and women's side and a minis side (Primary 1–7).

The men train on Friday nights from 7.30pm, the women on Wednesday nights from 7.30pm, the minis train on Sunday morning from 11am.

Sevens tournament

The club runs the Crieff Sevens. The teams compete for the Robin McNeil Cup.

Honours

Mens

 Crieff Sevens
 Champions (1): 1986

References

Rugby union in Perth and Kinross
Scottish rugby union teams